Bardejov is a town in North-Eastern Slovakia. It is situated in the Šariš region on a floodplain terrace of the Topľa River, in the hills of the Beskyd Mountains. It exhibits numerous cultural monuments in its completely intact medieval town center. The town is one of UNESCO's World Heritage Sites and currently maintains a population of about 32,000 inhabitants.

Etymology
There are two theories about the origin of the name. According to one theory, the name town comes from the Hungarian word "bárd", which indicated an amount of forested territory which could be chopped down by one man in one day. In the Hungarian name (Bártfa), the "fa" (English: "tree") suffix came later, and it also changed the last letter of "bárd" to "bárt", for easier pronunciation.

Another theory derives the name from a Christian personal name Barděj, Barduj (abbreviated forms of Bartholomew) with common Slavic possessive suffix -ov. This theory is supported by the first recorded form of the name – Bardujef (1241). The motivation by the personal name is supported also by the presence of the suffix preserved in later Polish or Slovak sources.

History
The territory of present-day Bardejov has attracted settlers since the Stone Age. However, the first written reference to the town dates back to the 1240s, when monks from Bártfa complained to King Béla IV of Hungary about a violation of the town's borders by Eperjes (today Prešov, Slovakia). By that time, the important church of Sv. Aegidius (St. Giles) had already been built. 

Heavily fortified in the 14th century, the town became a center of trade with Poland. More than 50 guilds controlled the flourishing economy. Bártfa gained the status of a royal town in 1376, later becoming a free royal town. In October 1410 at the Battle of Bardejov the Polish King Władysław II Jagiełło defeated the King Sigismund of Hungary and Croatia, who was later on crowned as King of Germany, King of Bohemia and Holy Roman Emperor.

The town's golden age ended in the 16th century, when several wars, pandemics, and other disasters plagued the country.

Beginning in the first quarter of the 18th century, the situation began to improve. Slovaks and Hasidic Jews came into Bártfa in large numbers. By the end of the century, the population of the town had regained the level of the 16th century. The burghers' houses were rebuilt or modified in keeping with current architectural fashion. A Jewish quarter with a synagogue, slaughterhouse, and ritual baths developed in the north-western suburbs. New churches and bridges were built, as well.

During the Reformation, Michal Radašin was called as town pastor.

Despite further fires in the last quarter of the 19th century, the town continued to thrive, thanks to major industrialization projects in the region. In 1893, a railway was opened connecting Eperjes to Bártfa. However, it declined again following its annexation and the establishment of the first Czechoslovak Republic, and became a backward farming region. World War II saw a worsening in the economic situation, though little damage from bombardment. Bardejov was taken by Soviet troops of the 1st Guards Army on 20 January 1945.

In 1950, Bardejov was declared a protected city core and extensive restoration of its cultural heritage began. These efforts culminated in Bardejov receiving the European Gold Medal by the International Board of Trustees in Hamburg in 1986 – the first town in Czechoslovakia to receive the award. On November 20, 2000, Bardejov was selected by UNESCO as one of its World Heritage Sites, recognized for its Jewish Suburbia and historic town center. In November 2010, the city marked the 10th anniversary of its inscription on the UNESCO World Heritage list.

Today, Bardejov is known mainly for its authentic old town square, which due to extensive restoration and preservation of its Medieval, Renaissance, and Gothic architecture has made Bardejov a popular tourist destination. The town draws on its rich heritage to further develop cultural traditions, such as an annual trade fair and the Roland Games (commemorating its medieval past).

Like many European small towns, Bardejov maintained a strong Jewish population before World War II and the Holocaust.

In March 2006, the Bardejov Jewish Preservation Committee was founded as a non-profit organization by Emil Fish, a survivor of Bergen-Belsen concentration camp who was born in Bardejov. In July 2005, Mr. Fish returned to Bardejov with his wife and son for the first time since 1949. His response to the disrepair and dilapidation of the synagogues and the Jewish cemetery was a resolve to restore and preserve these properties. The committee is composed of Bardejov survivors, their descendants and friends, and others interested in commemorating the vanishing Jewish communities of Eastern Europe. Today, the committee's stated mission is to: "restore the Jewish properties of Bardejov, Slovakia"; "build awareness of the cultural and historical significance of Jewish life in Bardejov and Slovakia"; and "advance knowledge of Jewish ancestry and heritage."

Landmarks

Bardejov is dominated by the monumental Church of St. Aegidius (Giles), mentioned for the first time in 1247. A three nave basilica with multiple chapels was completed in 1464. It hosts eleven precious Gothic winged altars with panel paintings. The central square (Slovak: Radničné námestie), which used to be the town's medieval marketplace, is surrounded by well-preserved Gothic and Renaissance burghers’ houses as well as the basilica.

The Church of St. Aegidius (Giles) was built by James of Polish Sącz. He is the teacher of Master Paul of Levoča who built the tallest wooden altar in the world. The church has many altars.

One of the most interesting buildings is the town hall, built in 1505. The lower part was built in the Gothic style, while the upper part was finished in the Renaissance style. This was the headquarters of the city council and also the center of the town's economic, social, and cultural life. In 1903, the town hall was adapted to serve as Šariš County Museum (Sárosi múzeum), now known as the Šariš Museum Bardejov, one of the oldest and the biggest museums in Slovakia.

The fortification system and town walls date from the 14th and 15th centuries and are listed by the European Fund of Cultural Heritage as one of the most elaborate and best preserved medieval fortifications in Slovakia.

About 2.5 km (1.6 mi) north of Bardejov is the spa town Bardejovské Kúpele. The therapeutic mineral water springs are claimed to be beneficial to people with oncological, blood circulation, and digestive tract problems. It also hosts an open-air museum of folk architecture (skansen).In the outskirts of the spa town Bardejovské Kúpele there is a historic Slovak Village called Šariš Village Museum. It has buildings that would be found in a typical Slovak Village. The spa has played host to a number of dignitaries, including Marie Louise, Duchess of Parma (the wife of Napoleon Bonaparte), Tsar Alexander I of Russia and Empress Elisabeth of Austria-Hungary. In this spa they also sell oblátky.

Sport
HC 46 Bardejov was the town's historic ice hockey team; they folded in 2016, HK Bardejov founded the same year as a phoenix club continue the club's hockey legacy.

Partizán Bardejov is the town's professional football team, who play at the local Municipal Stadium. The clubs' successful women's side folded 2012.

Administrative divisions
The town consists of the following boroughs:

Bardejov
Bardejovská Nová Ves
Bardejovská Zábava
Bardejovské Kúpele (local spa town)
Dlhá Lúka (annexed in 1971)
Mihaľov

Demographics
Bardejov has a population of 33,020 (as of December 31, 2010). According to the 2001 census, 91.3% of inhabitants were Slovaks, 2.6% Romani, 2.5% Rusyns, and 1.4% Ukrainians. The religious make-up was 63.2% Roman Catholics, 16.9% Greek Catholics, 7.6% Lutherans and 4.3% Eastern Orthodox.

By the 1910 census, it had 2,571 Slovak, 2,179 Hungarian and 1,617 German inhabitants.

Jews lived in the town for about 300 years. By the 1920s Jews made up 34% of the total population of Bardejov. In 1942, when Slovakia was under the influence of Nazi Germany, more than 3,000 Jews from Bardejov were deported to concentration camps, where most were murdered. Bardejov is now a "town without Jews."
The town was the northeast Hungarian majority settlement until the Ottoman wars near the Polish border.

Notable people
 Kéler Béla (1820-1882) – Hungarian composer famous in his time, best known for Erinnerung an Bartfeld csárdás
 Radoslav Rochallyi (born 1980) – writer
 Jack Garfein (grew up in Bardejov in the 30s and early 40s) – film director
 Morris D. Waldman (1879–1963) – rabbi and social worker, born in Bardejov

Twin towns – sister cities

Bardejov is twinned with:

 Calais, France
 Česká Lípa, Czech Republic
 Gorlice, Poland
 Jasło, Poland
 Kaštela, Croatia
 Krynica-Zdrój, Poland
 Mikulov, Czech Republic
 Mogilev, Belarus
 Molde, Norway
 Muszyna, Poland
 Přerov, Czech Republic
 Sárospatak, Hungary

 Sremski Karlovci, Serbia
 Suzdal, Russia
 Tiachiv, Ukraine
 Zamość, Poland

See also
 Battle of Bardejov
 List of municipalities and towns in Slovakia

References

Genealogical resources

The records for genealogical research are available at the state archive "Statny Archiv in Presov, Slovakia"

 Roman Catholic church records (births/marriages/deaths): 1671–1899 (parish A)
 Greek Catholic church records (births/marriages/deaths): 1753–1906 (parish B)
 Lutheran church records (births/marriages/deaths): 1592–1896 (parish A)

External links
 
 
  
 Info website
 UNESCO site about Bardejov
 Organization of World Heritage Cities: Bardejov
Surnames of living people in Bardejov

Bardejov
Cities and towns in Slovakia
World Heritage Sites in Slovakia
Spa towns in Slovakia
Magdeburg rights
Fortified settlements
Šariš
Villages and municipalities in Bardejov District